Zumba is a fitness program involving dance and aerobic elements.

Zumba may also refer to:

Ganga Zumba (died 1678), Brazilian leader
Zumba, stage name of Zaza Korinteli (born 1973), Georgian rock musician
Zumba (crater), on Mars
Zumba, Ecuador, capital of Chinchipe Canton
"Zumba" (song), a 2012 song by Don Omar

See also 
Zumba Fitness (disambiguation)